Raif Muradov (born 10 December 1993) is a Bulgarian footballer who plays as a defender for Levski Lom.

Career 
Muradov began his professional career at Chavdar Etropole. In 2013, he moved to Montana. After helping the team to gain promotion to A Group, he was released from the team and joined the 3rd league team Botev Vratsa.

In January 2016, Muradov returned to Montana. He made his A Group debut on 6 March 2016 in a match against Cherno More Varna.  On 24 November 2016, Muradov's contract was terminated by mutual consent.

On 22 December 2016, Muradov joined Oborishte Panagyurishte. On 30 June 2017, he moved to Chernomorets Balchik.

In January 2018, Muradov joined North-West Third League side Spartak Pleven but was released at the end of the season.

On 24 July 2018, Muradov signed with Kariana.

References

External links
 
 

Living people
1993 births
People from Gotse Delchev
Bulgarian footballers
Bulgaria youth international footballers
Association football defenders
Association football fullbacks
FC Chavdar Etropole players
FC Montana players
FC Botev Vratsa players
FC Oborishte players
FC Chernomorets Balchik players
PFC Spartak Pleven players
FC Kariana Erden players
First Professional Football League (Bulgaria) players
Second Professional Football League (Bulgaria) players
Sportspeople from Blagoevgrad Province